Gortnaleck Court Tomb is a court cairn and National Monument located in County Sligo, Ireland.

Location

History
Gortnaleck Court Tomb was constructed in the Neolithic, c. 4000–2500 BC.

Description

References

National Monuments in County Sligo
Archaeological sites in County Sligo
Tombs in the Republic of Ireland